Gustaf Harald Arbin (ne Andersson, 4 August 1867 – 31 July 1944) was a Swedish diver, track and field athlete, and rower. He competed in diving (10 m platform) at the 1908 and 1912 Summer Olympics and finished sixth in 1912.

Arbin won Swedish titles in several track and field disciplines, including the 100 metres, 110 metres hurdles, long jump and javelin throw. He broke Swedish records in the 100 m (10.8 seconds), 200 metres (26.4 seconds) and the long jump (6.03 metres). His performance of 10.8 seconds for the 100 m, set in Helsingborg in 1896, ranked as an unofficial world record for the distance. This stood until 1906, when fellow Swede Knut Lindberg recorded a time of 10.6 seconds.

References

1867 births
1944 deaths
Sportspeople from Gothenburg
Swedish male divers
Olympic divers of Sweden
Divers at the 1908 Summer Olympics
Divers at the 1912 Summer Olympics
Swedish male sprinters
Swedish male long jumpers
World record setters in athletics (track and field)
20th-century Swedish people